Hessel Gerritsz ( – buried 4 September 1632) was a Dutch engraver, cartographer, and publisher. He was one of the notable figures in the Golden Age of Netherlandish cartography. Despite strong competition, he is considered by some "unquestionably the chief Dutch cartographer of the 17th century".

Early career 
He started in Alkmaar as an apprentice to Willem Jansz Blaeu, who was ten years his elder. Gerritsz moved with Blaeu’s workshop to Amsterdam, where he married Geertje Gijsberts of Alkmaar in 1607. They had eight children. Geertje would die before 1624, when Hessel remarried. By 1610 he had a printing workshop on his own. Many of his engravings and maps made it into the atlases of Blaeu, Jan Janssonius, and others.

Career

Printer 

Gerritsz produced a world map in 1612 that included the discoveries of Queirós and specifically indicated "Austrialia del Espiritu Santo", now known to be Vanuatu, but for long thought to be part of the "South land". The map was very influential on Dutch and French representations of the South Pacific in the 17th and 18th centuries, and was together with Queirós' publications influential in establishing the name "Australia". In 1613, Gerritsz wrote and published a History of the land named Spitsbergen, describing the discovery, early voyages and whaling activities on these islands. This volume also showcases Gerritsz's considerable talents as an engraver (see for example his depiction of a walrus with its calf above right). The same year, he edited a map of Russia prepared by the future Feodor II of Russia as tsarevich, and re-edited it in 1614 with some additions and corrections; it was reproduced by the Blaeu firm until 1665. Another example of an engraving is his often reproduced 1619 posthumous portrait of the playwright Gerbrand Adriaensz Bredero.

Cartography 
His fame as cartographer grew rapidly to the point that on 16 October 1617 he was appointed the first exclusive cartographer of the Dutch East India Company (VOC), probably the most strategic position a cartographer could have in those days. He got the position on recommendation of Petrus Plancius, chief scientist of the VOC, who did not get along with the senior Willem Blaeu (Blaeu and Gerritsz remained friends). Gerritsz kept this post until his death, after which the position was held by the Blaeu family, starting with Willem Jansz, until 1705.

Gerritsz's map of 1622 showed the first part of Australia to be charted, that by Willem Janszoon in 1606. It was considered to be part of New Guinea and called Nueva Guinea on the map, but Gerritsz also added an inscription saying: "Those who sailed with the yacht of Pedro Fernandez de Quiros in the neighbourhood of New Guinea to 10 degrees westward through many islands and shoals and over 2, 3 and 4 fathoms for as many as 40 days, presumed that New Guinea did not extend beyond 10 degrees to the south. If this be so, then the land from 9 to 14 degrees would be a separate land, different from the other New Guinea".

All charts and logs from returning VOC merchants and explorers sailors had to be submitted to Gerritsz and thanks to the wealth of new information several breakthrough maps came from his hands. In return Gerritsz’ charts accompanied all VOC captains on their voyages.

Mapping of Australia 

Gerritsz published in Amsterdam in 1612 a Dutch translation of the eighth memorial of Quiros, the title page of which includes the words, "'t Land ghenaemt Australia Incognita." This is believed to be "the earliest occurrence in print of the word Australia outside Spain". The publication of 1612 referred to included Isaac Massa's description of Siberia ('Samoyeden Landt'), his short account of the roads from Muscovy, and the memorial mentioned. It included three maps, one of which was a map of the world by Gerritsz, in which the Torres Strait is clearly shown.

In 1618, Gerritsz produced a chart of the Indonesian islands, far better represented than on earlier efforts, and, for the first time, the (Northwest) coast of Australia. In 1622 he bundled many of his maps in a map book for the VOC. This map book included a 1622 map of the Pacific, probably the "Map of the Great South Sea" that Abel Tasman consulted extensively on his voyage around Australia and to New Zealand in 1642. In 1627 Gerritsz made a map, the Caert van't Landt van d'Eendracht, entirely devoted to the discoveries of the West Australian coastline. Australia is called "Eendrachtsland", a name given by Dirk Hartog after his stay on its coast in 1616, and which would be in use until the end of the 17th century. In 1628, he added the 1627 charting of Australia’s South coast by François Thijssen to the map mentioned above, making this the first map showing a outline of Australia.

Later years 
Gerritsz's interest in the New World was so extensive that, unusual for a cartographer in his position, he joined on a 1628/29 voyage to Brazil and the Caribbean. He contributed the maps of Joannes de Laet’s Beschrijvinghe van West-Indiën ("Description of the West Indies") published in 1630. Especially his map of Florida, based on French and Spanish sources, became influential (e.g. for 200 years after, Florida would be known as "Tegesta" as Gerritsz had named it).

Gerritsz died in 1632; he was buried in the Nieuwe Kerk on 4 September. Willem Janszoon Blaeu would take his place as cartographer of the VOC in January of the following year.

References

External links 

  
  

17th-century Dutch cartographers
1580s births
1632 deaths
Burials at the Nieuwe Kerk, Amsterdam
Dutch East India Company people from Amsterdam
Engravers from Amsterdam
Dutch publishers (people)
People from Uitgeest